Lac-des-Plages is a town and municipality in the Outaouais region of Quebec, Canada, part of the Papineau Regional County Municipality. It is named after Lac des Plages (French for "Lake of Beaches") which attracts many vacationers with the beauty of its beaches.

History
The community and post office have been identified under several other names, following the name changes of the adjacent lake. It was first known as Lac Rond (Round Lake), Lac Desormeaux (in honour of pioneer Norbert Desormeaux who arrived in the territory in 1890), as well as Lac des Sables (Sand Lake).

In 1950, the Municipality of Lac-des-Plages was formed when its territory detached from the United Township Municipality of Suffolk-et-Addington.

Demographics

Mother tongue:
 English as first language: 3.6%
 French as first language: 90.9%
 English and French as first language: 3.6%
 Other as first language: 1.8%

References

External links

Incorporated places in Outaouais
Municipalities in Quebec